Gouda Goverwelle is a railway station located on the Utrecht–Rotterdam railway in the Goverwelle area of Gouda in the Netherlands. The railway station, which opened in 1993, consists of two island platforms.

Train services
The following services call at Gouda Goverwelle:
2x per hour local service (sprinter) Uitgeest - Amsterdam - Woerden - Rotterdam
2x per hour local service (sprinter) Rotterdam - Gouda Goverwelle
2x per hour local service (sprinter) The Hague - Gouda - Utrecht
2x per hour local service (stoptrein) The Hague - Gouda Goverwelle

External links
NS website 
Dutch Public Transport journey planner 

Railway stations in South Holland
Railway stations opened in 1993
Gouda, South Holland